Steam Bandits: Outpost is an independent free-to-play steam punk themed city building video game by American developer Iocaine Studios. The title is the first one planned out of three, all taking place in the same game world with the goal of eventually allowing players of one game to interact with players of the other two.

Gameplay

In Steam Bandits: Outpost, players are tasked with building up, developing, and overseeing towns on various floating islands in the game world. Along the way, players can recruit a variety of airship captains to complete campaigns and missions, duel other players, or cooperate with friends.

The game is slated to support cross-platform play, allowing players from different platforms to interact with one another.

Business Model

Steam Bandits: Outpost has been marketed as an "anti-Facebook game" and eschews the format of "pay-to-win" and "pay-to-continue" games in favor of a "pay-to-style" system.

Players will be able to use real money to purchase Iocaine points which will allow for the customization of a variety of in-game visual aspects including; city overseer avatar, buildings, airship captain appearance, and pets.

Development

On July 27, 2012, Iocaine Studios began their kickstarter for Steam Bandits: Outpost

On August 10, 2012, the game met its initial funding goal of $30,000.

On August 19, 2012, the game completed its kickstarter funding, raising a total of $55,362.

References

External links

Developer Website

2012 video games
Indie video games
Casual games
City-building games
Steampunk video games
Free-to-play video games
Windows games
MacOS games
IOS games
Linux games
Android (operating system) games
Kickstarter-funded video games
Multiplayer and single-player video games
Video games developed in the United States